Charnwit Polcheewin is a Thai football coach. He was the head coach of the Thailand national football team.

Managerial career
In club level, he brought Thai Farmers Bank to two consecutive AFC Champions League (then Asian Club Championship) titles in 1993–94 and 1994–95. He coached Thailand during their successful campaign in the 2005 SEA Games. He resigned from the post on 20 February 2007 to coach Vietnamese club Đồng Tháp. However, as the transfer did not go through, he return to his post as the Thai national team coach. He was confirmed in this position in April 2007 after the election of the new FAT President and the appointment of a new executive committee.

Polcheewin left his post in the national team on 22 June 2008, after the 2010 World Cup qualifier game against Oman. In his final game, Thailand lost 1–2 to Oman.  Polcheewin was again linked with the Vietnamese side Đồng Tháp on 20 November 2008, according to the Vietnam Bridge website.

Political careers
Charnwit was appointed as senator in Senate of Thailand on 14 May 2019.

Honours

Managers
Thai Farmers Bank
AFC Champions League: 1994, 1995

Thailand
SEA Games: 2005

Individual
AFC Coach of the Year: 1994

Notes

Charnwit Polcheewin
Charnwit Polcheewin
Thailand national football team managers
2007 AFC Asian Cup managers
1956 births
Living people
Charnwit Polcheewin
Charnwit Polcheewin